First Shot is a 2002 American made-for-television action thriller film. It is the third entry in the Alex McGregor film series, the first two being First Daughter (1999) and First Target (2000). Mariel Hemingway reprises the role she originated in First Daughter, while Jenna Leigh Green takes over the role of Presidential daughter Jess Hayes (originated by Monica Keena).

Plot
After an explosion at an army base that kills several soldiers, President Jonathan Hayes (Gregory Harrison) attends a memorial service and is shot while speaking. It is revealed that a militia rebel group has resurfaced with a vengeance to assassinate President Jonathan Hayes for the death of their brothers. Agent Alex McGregor (Mariel Hemingway), now the Director of the United States Secret Service, tries to prevent the attack on the President's life, but when the President is shot and agent McGregor's husband Grant Coleman (Doug Savant), is kidnapped, the stakes are raised, and Alex realizes she has become a target as well.

Cast
 Mariel Hemingway as Secret Service Agent Alex McGregor
 Doug Savant as Grant Coleman
 Gregory Harrison as President Jonathan Hayes
 Jenna Leigh Green as First Daughter Jessica "Jess" Hayes
 Wanda Cannon as Kathryn Yarnell
 Sebastian Spence as Secret Service Agent Owen Taylor
 Steve Makaj as FBI Special Agent Judd Walters
 Andrew Johnston as Secret Service Agent Brent McIntosh
 Michelle Harrison as Secret Service Agent Courtney Robinson
 Dean Wray as Adam Carter
 Christian Bochner as Rick Knight

Reception
Steven Oxman from Variety wrote about the film: "Director Armand Mastroianni and his team's most significant achievement in First Shot is to make sure we don't associate any of this with reality. In other words, nobody's concerned about who's running the country when the president is unconscious — here, they're all more concerned with thawing the cold war between the president's daughter (Jenna Leigh Green) and his girlfriend (Wanda Cannon). Believe it or not, there's something kind of appealing about the film's ability to bury its head that deep in the sand".

Rotten Tomatoes lists one positive and one negative review for the film. John Leonard of New York Magazine wrote: "The same old militia is back again, this time kidnapping Mariel's husband, and it also bombs the officer's club at an Army base, and quite a lot of clap is trapped".

References

External links
 

2002 television films
2002 films
2002 action thriller films
American action thriller films
Action television films
American thriller television films
Films about fictional presidents of the United States
Films directed by Armand Mastroianni
Films scored by Louis Febre
Television sequel films
TBS original films
2000s English-language films
2000s American films